Huberia striata is a species of ant in the genus Huberia, endemic to New Zealand.

See also
Huberia brounii, the single other species of the genus

References

External links
https://www.antwiki.org/wiki/Huberia_striata

Myrmicinae
Ants of New Zealand
Insects described in 1876
Endemic fauna of New Zealand
Taxa named by Frederick Smith (entomologist)

Hymenoptera of New Zealand
Endemic insects of New Zealand